Anne Cécile Lequien (born 24 December 1977) is a former French Paralympic swimmer. She had her forearms and her right leg amputated after suffering from meningitis aged two years old.

References

External links 
 
 
 

1977 births
Living people
People from Issy-les-Moulineaux
Paralympic swimmers of France
Swimmers at the 1992 Summer Paralympics
Swimmers at the 2000 Summer Paralympics
Swimmers at the 2004 Summer Paralympics
Medalists at the 1992 Summer Paralympics
Medalists at the 2000 Summer Paralympics
Medalists at the 2004 Summer Paralympics
French amputees
Paralympic medalists in swimming
Paralympic gold medalists for France
Paralympic silver medalists for France
Paralympic bronze medalists for France
S4-classified Paralympic swimmers
French female backstroke swimmers
French female butterfly swimmers
Medalists at the World Para Swimming Championships
21st-century French women
20th-century French women